Herbert Norman Carter (January 1, 1928 – October 16, 1953) was a Canadian football player who played for the Calgary Stampeders. He won the Grey Cup with them in 1948. Playing his junior football in Calgary, Carter was a blacksmith's apprentice. He died in a hunting accident in Calgary in 1953 at the age of 25.

References

1928 births
1953 deaths
Canadian football people from Calgary
Players of Canadian football from Alberta
Calgary Stampeders players